Zinc finger protein 648 is a protein that in humans is encoded by the ZNF648 gene.

References

Further reading 

Human proteins